was a stable of sumo wrestlers, one of the Takasago group of stables. It was established in its modern incarnation in May 1986 by Fujizakura of the Takasago stable. It did not produce any makuuchi wrestlers. As of December 2007 it had 14 sumo wrestlers. The stable had a policy of not recruiting foreigners or former collegiate competitors. Instead, the stablemaster only accepted new recruits out of middle school. However, he did allow his wrestlers to take high school correspondence courses over the internet.

The former Fujizakura reached the mandatory retirement age of 65 early in 2013 and as there was no successor available, the stable closed in December 2012 with five of its remaining wrestlers, including former jūryō Hishofuji, transferring to Azumazeki stable, and the other two retiring.

The stable's premises were subsequently used by the Musashigawa stable.

Owner
1986-2013: 10th Nakamura (former sekiwake Fujizakura)

Notable wrestlers
 
 (aka Sumiya), best rank jūryō
, best rank jūryō 
, best rank jūryō
Hishofuji, best rank jūryō

See also
List of sumo stables

References

External links 
Nakamura stable home page (Japanese)
Nakamura stable page at Japan Sumo Association (English) (Japanese)
Article on Nakamura stable (English)

Defunct sumo stables